This is a list of films which placed number one at the weekend box office for the year 2016.

Highest-grossing films

See also
 List of American films — American films by year

References

 

2016
2016 in Venezuela
Venezuela